Timothy Joseph DeZarn (born July 11, 1952, in Cincinnati, Ohio) is an American actor who has appeared in film and television. Alternately credited as deZarn, he is often cast  in supporting roles in the horror, crime, and science fiction genres.

DeZarn's motion picture credits include Spider-Man (playing Mary Jane Watson's father), Fight Club, Live Free or Die Hard, The Cabin in the Woods, Untraceable, and Demon Knight.

DeZarn has appeared in several American television series, including  Dr. Quinn, Medicine Woman, NYPD Blue, the various Star Trek TV franchises, Prime Suspect, Mad Men, The Forgotten, Lost, Criminal Minds, Weeds, Prison Break, Deadwood, The Shield, Cold Case, Quantum Leap, 7th Heaven, and Sons of Anarchy.

Biography 
Tim DeZarn was born on July 11, 1952. DeZarn went to Archbishop McNicholas High School, a Catholic school in Anderson Township, Ohio. He did not pursue a professional acting career until he was 25 years old.

Acting career 
His first broadcast role was on the TV series The Equalizer in 1986. His first film role was in the 1989 action comedy Three Fugitives.

DeZarn made several appearances as Army Sergeant Dixon on the television series Dr. Quinn, Medicine Woman. He played the recurring character George Putnam in season two of NYPD Blue. He appeared in five episodes of Deadwood on HBO. DeZarn appeared in Sons of Anarchy as Nate Meineke, the leader of a local state militia and terrorist group. He appeared in sci-fi horror film Project Dorothy (directed by George Henry Horton) in 2019.

Personal life 
DeZarn lives in Los Angeles with his wife and daughter. His 18-year-old son Travis was killed in an auto accident in 2007.

Filmography

References

External links

 

American male film actors
American male television actors
Living people
Male actors from Cincinnati
20th-century American male actors
21st-century American male actors
1952 births